Charles Michael Camic (born September 27, 1951) is the Lorraine H. Morton Professor of sociology at Northwestern University. His research focuses on sociological theory, the sociology of science, and historical sociology.

Education and career
Camic received his B.A. in sociology summa cum laude from the University of Pittsburgh in 1973. He went on to receive his M.A. and Ph.D., also in sociology, from the University of Chicago in 1975 and 1979, respectively. In 1979, he became an assistant professor of sociology at the University of Wisconsin-Madison, where he was promoted to associate professor in 1984 and to full professor in 1988. In 1999, he became the Martindale-Bascom Professor at the University of Wisconsin-Madison. In 2006, he left the University of Wisconsin-Madison to become the John Evans Professor of sociology at Northwestern, where he was appointed the Lorraine H. Morton Professor in 2016.

Editorial activities
From 1999 to 2003, Camic was the co-editor-in-chief of the American Sociological Review, along with Franklin D. Wilson. As of February 2017, he is a senior editor for Theory and Society.

References

Living people
1951 births
Northwestern University faculty
American sociologists
Academic journal editors
University of Pittsburgh alumni
University of Chicago alumni
University of Wisconsin–Madison faculty
American Sociological Review editors